The Onafhankelijke Burger Partij (OBP) is a political party in the Netherlands. It was founded by Hero Brinkman, a Member of the House of Representatives for the Party for Freedom (PVV). Brinkman left the PVV after repeatedly criticising the lack of democracy within that party, as well as its negative generalisations about certain groups in society. He then founded the OBP and intended it to participate in the Dutch general election of 2012; however, on June 9, 2012 he announced that the OBP was to merge with the party Trots op Nederland to form a new party, the Democratic Political Turning Point (DPK). However, Trots op Nederland announced on November 17 that the merger of the OBP with the Trots would be reversed, because the Trots' management was unsatisfied with it.

References

External links
  Official site Democratic Political Turning Point
  Official site Proud of the Netherlands

Anti-Islam political parties in Europe
Defunct political parties in the Netherlands
Eurosceptic parties in the Netherlands
Conservative liberal parties
Liberal parties in the Netherlands
Defunct nationalist parties in the Netherlands
Right-wing populism in the Netherlands
Right-wing populist parties
Political parties established in 2012
Political parties disestablished in 2012
2012 establishments in the Netherlands
2012 disestablishments in the Netherlands
Anti-Islam sentiment in the Netherlands